The Kom or Kam are a Nuristani tribe in Afghanistan and Pakistan. 

Most used alternative names  are Kamozi,  Kamoz/Camoze, Caumojee/Kaumoji, and Camoje.

History
Until the late 19th century, the Kom were a sub-group of the Siah-Posh Kafirs ("black-robed unbelievers") and their political (factional) headquarters was at Kombrom. They gave allegiance to the Mehtar (crown prince) of Chitral. At that time, following their conquest by Emir Abdur Rahman Khan, the Kom converted to Islam. Kafiristan ("Land of Unbelievers") was renamed Nuristan  ("Land of Light") and its inhabitants became collectively known as Nuristanis (sometimes loosely translated as "enlightened ones").

By the end of the 19th century, the Kom were concentrated in the lower part of the Bashgul Valley and came to control it. Hence the valley became also known as Kam,, Kamdesh in the Khowar language, and as Kamoz in Pashto. The country of the Kom is also known as Komstan.

While they have never been regarded as numerous, the Kom have been respected for their military prowess by neighboring peoples, including the Chitralis and Pashtuns.

See also
 Nurestan
 Nuristani people
 Nuristani languages 
 Katir
 Kamviri
 Kambojas

References

 George Scott Robertson (1896), The Kafirs of Hindukush
 Mountstuart Elphinstone (1815), An Account of the Kingdom of Caubol, London
 J. Biddulph (1971), Tribes of Hindukush, Craz (Austria)
 The Kom. Retrieved July 4, 2006, from Richard F. Strand: Nuristan, Hidden Land of the Hindu-Kush .

Ethnic groups in Afghanistan
Nuristani tribes
Ethnic groups in Pakistan